Homoranthus zeteticorum is a flowering plant in the family Myrtaceae and is endemic to a small area in central Queensland. It is a tall shrub with axehead-shaped leaves and pendulous flowers with darker styles.

Description
Homoranthus zeteticorum is an upright shrub, the leaves are arranged opposite on a short petiole. Flowering occurs sporadically throughout the year and the fruit is a one-seeded nut.

Taxonomy and naming
Homoranthus zeteticorum was first formally described in 1991 by Lyndley Craven and Sandra Raelene Jones and the description was published in Australian Systematic Botany. The specific epithet (zeteticorum) is from the Greek zetetikos, meaning "disposed to research", latinised and given the genitive plural form, meaning "in honour of persons who, for their enjoyment, explore natural vegetation".

Distribution and habitat
This homoranthus grows in shrubby woodland and heath on shallow, sandy soils derived from sandstone. It is only known from the Salvator Rosa section of Carnarvon National Park where it grows on Homoranthus Hill.

Conservation status
Homoranthus zeteticorum is considered a rare species with a restricted distribution. ROTAP conservation code 2RC-, Briggs and Leigh (1996).

References

External links
 The Australasian Virtual Herbarium – Occurrence data for zeteticorum

Flora of New South Wales
Myrtales of Australia
zeteticorum
Plants described in 1991
Taxa named by Lyndley Craven